The United States Federal Standard 595 camouflage colors, also known as MERDC camouflage colors, were developed by the Mobility Equipment Research and Design Command (M.E.R.D.C) during the 1970s. The colors and pattern scheme could be adjusted as the environments changed. Military modelers often use the Federal Standard 595 colours for painting models and soldiers.

Camouflage colors
To be included in the list the color must comply with Federal Standard 595 and have the word "camouflage" in it.

References

External links
Mil Spec Coating

Color schemes
Military camouflage
Standards of the United States